United Nations Security Council resolution 574, adopted unanimously on 7 October 1985, after hearing representations from the People's Republic of Angola, the Council recalled resolutions 387 (1976), 418 (1977), 428 (1978), 447 (1979), 454 (1979), 475 (1980), 545 (1983), 546 (1984), 567 (1985) and 571 (1985), and expressed its concern at the continuing attacks on the country by South Africa through occupied South West Africa.

The Council demanded South Africa cease the attacks and respect Angola's sovereignty and territorial integrity, noting that Angola has the right of self-defense to defend its territory and is entitled to compensation for the attacks. The resolution demanded that South Africa withdraw immediately all its military forces from Angola. It also condemned South Africa for using occupied Namibia (then South West Africa) as a springboard for the attacks, urging all member states to implement the arms embargo imposed in Resolution 418 (1977) on South Africa.

Finally, the commission established in Resolution 571 (1985) consisting of Australia, Egypt and Peru was required to assess the damage caused by the recent attack.

See also
 Angola – South Africa relations
 List of United Nations Security Council Resolutions 501 to 600 (1982–1987)
 Namibian War of Independence
 South Africa Border Wars
 South Africa under apartheid

References
Text of the Resolution at undocs.org

External links
 

 0574
20th century in South Africa
1985 in South Africa
1985 in Africa
1985 in Angola
 0574
Angola–South Africa relations
October 1985 events